Homage to the Queen, Op. 42, by Malcolm Arnold was written as the official coronation ballet in 1953, commissioned by the Sadler's Wells Ballet in honour of Queen Elizabeth II, the ballet company's musical adviser Humphrey Searle having recommended Arnold for the job. The original choreography was created by Frederick Ashton. It was first performed by the Sadler's Wells Ballet on Coronation night 2 June 1953 at the Royal Opera House Covent Garden, with original scenery and costumes by Oliver Messel. The Orchestra was conducted by Robert Irving.

Amongst the original performers were:

 Nadia Nerina as Queen of the Earth
 Violetta Elvin as Queen of the Waters
 Beryl Grey as Queen of Fire
 Margot Fonteyn as Queen of the Air
 John Hart

The ballet became part of the Sadler's Wells Ballet's regular repertoire during the mid-1950s. In the 1990s the Queen of the Air segment was revived.

2006 recreation
To celebrate the 80th birthday of Queen Elizabeth the ballet was revived in 2006. Apart from the Entree and the Queen of the Air, much of Ashton's original choreography was lost during the years, so new ones were created for three of the sequences based on surviving material.
 Earth by David Bintley
 Water by Michael Corde
 Fire by Christopher Wheeldon

Concert suites
The composer extracted a 17-minute concert suite, Op. 42a, from the ballet. There are also a version for wind band and a 9-minute solo piano version.

References

  Malcolm Arnold

Ballets by Frederick Ashton
Ballets by Malcolm Arnold
1953 ballet premieres
Ballets created for The Royal Ballet
1953 compositions